Aleksandr Smirnov (born 25 January 1974) is a Russian sprinter. He competed in the men's 4 × 100 metres relay at the 2000 Summer Olympics.

References

1974 births
Living people
Place of birth missing (living people)
Russian male sprinters
Olympic male sprinters
Olympic athletes of Russia
Athletes (track and field) at the 2000 Summer Olympics
Russian Athletics Championships winners
21st-century Russian people